Bozarmut   is a town in Yatağan district of  Muğla Province, Turkey. The population of the town is 2,168 as of 2011. Bozarmut was one of the six towns of Stratonicea during the ancient age.

References

Populated places in Muğla Province
Towns in Turkey
Yatağan District